IKS or Iks may mean:

 the members of the Ik tribe in Uganda
IKS magazine (InformCourier-Svyaz) - Russian telecommunications, media, and IT magazine
 "Imperial Klingon Starship", a ship prefix used by Klingon starships in Star Trek
 Indian Knowledge System